Isaac Ikhouria (born 9 October 1947) is a retired light-heavyweight boxer from Nigeria who won a bronze medal at the 1972 Summer Olympics. A year later he won a gold medal at the 1973 All-Africa Games.

References

1947 births
Living people
Light-heavyweight boxers
Olympic boxers of Nigeria
Olympic bronze medalists for Nigeria
Boxers at the 1972 Summer Olympics
Olympic medalists in boxing
Boxers at the 1970 British Commonwealth Games
Boxers at the 1974 British Commonwealth Games
Commonwealth Games bronze medallists for Nigeria
Nigerian male boxers
Medalists at the 1972 Summer Olympics
Commonwealth Games medallists in boxing
African Games gold medalists for Nigeria
African Games medalists in boxing
Boxers at the 1973 All-Africa Games
20th-century Nigerian people
Medallists at the 1974 British Commonwealth Games